The 5th Fighter Aviation Regiment (Russian: 5-й истребительный авиационный полк) was a fighter regiment of the Soviet Air Forces (Russian: Военно-воздушные силы) which took part in the Soviet-Japanese War.

History

The regiment was formed on September 7, 1938, in the Siberian Military District. On May 31st, 1939, the regiment was transferred to cover the 1st Red Banner Army until June 15, 1939.

On June 22, 1941, the regiment, located at Sukhaya Rechka, was part of 32nd Mixed Aviation Division (or 33rd? :ru:33-я смешанная авиационная дивизия), earmarked to support 1st Red Banner Army, alongside two other fighter regiments and a bomber regiment.

On August 9th, with the Soviet entry into the Pacific War, the 5th Fighter Aviation Regiment was moved to the front and flew sorties until September 3rd, 1945.

Commanders
List of commanders for the entire duration of the regiment:
 Colonel Lisin Vasilsi Timofeevich (1938)
 Lieutenant colonel Manaseyev Dmitry Ivanovich (December 2nd, 1942 – December 31st, 1945)

Aircraft Operated

See also
Strategic operations of the Red Army in World War II

References

Citations

Bibliography
 Multiple authors. List No. 12 aviation regiments of the Air Force of the Red Army, which were part of the Active Army during the Great Patriotic War of 1941-1945 / Pokrovsky. — Ministry of Defense of the USSR. Military-Scientific Directorate of the General Staff. — Moscow: Voenizdat, 1960. - T. Appendix to the Directive of the General Staff of January 18, 1960 No. 170023.
 Vse istrebitelʹnye aviapolki Stalina : pervaia polnaia ėntsiklopediia. Moskva: Yauza-press. 2014 . Also rendered as Anokhin V.A. Bykov M.Yu. All fighter regiments of Stalin. The first complete encyclopedia. — Popular science edition. - Moscow: Yauza-press, 2014. - S. 304–308. — 944 p."

Fighter aviation regiments of the Soviet Union in World War II
Fighter regiments of the Soviet Air Forces
1938 establishments in the Soviet Union
1947 disestablishments in the Soviet Union
Military units and formations established in 1938
Military units and formations disestablished in 1947